The Chinese Ambassador to Burkina Faso is the official representative of the People's Republic of China to Burkina Faso.

List of representatives

See also

Burkina Faso–Taiwan relations
Burkina Faso–China relations

References 

 
Burkina Faso
China